Costa Venezia is a , most recently operated by Costa Crociere. Originally intended to serve the Chinese market, she debuted in Shanghai on May 18, 2019. Costa Venezia is scheduled to be transferred to Carnival in 2023 under the new Costa by Carnival concept. She is to be renamed Carnival Venezia.

History

Planning and construction 
Carnival Corporation entered a strategic agreement with Fincantieri in March 2015 about five cruise ships for delivery between 2019 and 2022. The Enchanted Princess was ordered in April 2016. In December 2015 Carnival and Fincantieri signed a memorandum of agreement about four cruise ships of them.
In January 2016, Carnival Corporation announced that they had made firm their commitment with Fincantieri to expand Costa Cruises' Asia fleet, with two vessels at  each, with a guest capacity of approximately 4,200 passengers. The contracts were finalized in April 2016, which were built off of a memorandum agreed upon between the cruise line and the shipyard earlier in 2015. The ships, comprising a new class of vessels in Costa's fleet, were planned to carry an interior design that would focus on Costa's Italian traditions for their Asian clientele to experience.

On November 1, 2017, Costa Cruises announced that the first of the two vessels built specifically for the Chinese market would be named Costa Venezia. The announcement came at the coin ceremony for the ship at the Fincantieri shipyard in Monfalcone. On June 22, 2018, Costa Venezia was floated out from the shipyard and additional details were also announced about the ship's interior design and facilities, revealing that many of the key features of the ship would be inspired by Venetian landmarks and their architecture, including the ship's main atrium, theatre, and restaurants. She completed her first round of sea trials on December 27, 2018 and began the second round on January 18, 2019.

Delivery and christening 
Fincantieri officially delivered Costa Venezia to Costa Cruises on February 28, 2019 in Monfalcone.

Costa Venezias godmother, Gan Beiye, a frequent cruiser with Costa Cruises, officially christened the vessel at the naming ceremony on March 1, 2019 in Trieste.

Itineraries 
Costa Venezia held a vernissage cruise on March 3, 2019, departing from Trieste to Greece and Croatia, before arriving back in Trieste on March 8. Its official inaugural voyage was a 53-day cruise that departed on May 8 from Trieste to Tokyo. Beginning on May 18, 2019, Costa Venezia was homeported year-round in Shanghai, serving exclusively Chinese guests on itineraries around East Asia. Starting in May 2022, she began cruising from Istanbul, Turkey.

On June 22, 2022, it was announced that Costa Venezia would sail under the Carnival brand in 2023, from New York City, New York. With Carnival and Costa debuting a new concept, Costa by Carnival. The ship will be renamed Carnival Venezia and have a Carnival Italian Style livery. It will be staffed and operated by Carnival Cruise Line, and will enter dry dock before sailing from North America. It will finish its cruises for Costa in early December. Costa Venezias sister ship  will also debut under the Carnival brand in 2024, and will sail from Long Beach, California. In December 2022, Carnival announced that these two ships will be known as the Venice-class.

Carnival Venezia will debut on May 29, 2023, sailing a 15 Day Transatlantic voyage from Barcelona, Spain ending in New York. The ship will pick up Carnival Magic's original planned summer season from New York, sailing a mix of four to eight day sailings to Bermuda, Caribbean and Canada & New England. Towards the end of September, the ship will sail a mixture of eight to twelve day cruises to The Bahamas and the Caribbean for the winter season. Miami, Florida will also be a featured port of call on some nine-day cruises to The Bahamas.

References

Venezia
Ships built by Fincantieri
2018 ships